Ivan Herceg may refer to:
 Ivan Herceg (actor)
 Ivan Herceg (footballer)

See also
Iván Herczeg, sprint canoeist